Valeri Stanislavovich Panchik (born 10 July 1963) is a former Russian-Ukrainian professional footballer.

Honours
 USSR Federation Cup finalist: 1988.

External links
 

1963 births
People from Korosten
Living people
Soviet footballers
Russian footballers
Russian expatriate footballers
Ukrainian footballers
Ukrainian expatriate footballers
Association football defenders
Expatriate footballers in Poland
FC Dnepr Mogilev players
SC Tavriya Simferopol players
FC Zenit Saint Petersburg players
FC Metalist Kharkiv players
Soviet Top League players
Ukrainian Premier League players
FC Yugra Nizhnevartovsk players
Neftçi PFK players
FC Izhevsk players
Sportspeople from Zhytomyr Oblast